Eucithara obesa is a small sea snail, a marine gastropod mollusk in the family Mangeliidae.

Description
The length of the shell attains 11 mm.

The shell is closely ribbed, crossed by numerous revolving striae. Its color is yellowish brown, fasciate with chestnut.

Distribution
This marine species occurs off the Philippines and Guam

References

  Reeve, L.A. 1846. Monograph of the genus Mangelia. pls 1-8 in Reeve, L.A. (ed). Conchologia Iconica. London : L. Reeve & Co. Vol. 3.

External links
  Tucker, J.K. 2004 Catalog of recent and fossil turrids (Mollusca: Gastropoda). Zootaxa 682:1-1295
 
 Smith, Barry D. "Prosobranch gastropods of Guam." Micronesica 35.36 (2003): 244-270. 

obesa
Gastropods described in 1846